Wrightwood station could refer to:
 Wrightwood station (CTA), a former Chicago "L" station
 Wrightwood station (Metra), a commuter rail station in Chicago